Knabenschiessen is a traditional target shooting competition in Zürich, held on the second weekend of September each year. The festival, officially held for the first time in 1889, is one of the oldest in Switzerland, dating back to the 17th century.

The competition is open to 13- to 17-year-olds who either reside or are enrolled in a school in the canton of Zürich. Originally reserved for boys (Knaben), the competition has been open to female participants since 1991. The shooting is with the Swiss Army ordnance rifle, SIG SG 550. The competition is held in the shooting range at Albisgütli to the south-west of the city center, on the slope of Uetliberg. It is surrounded by a large fair.

References

External links

September sporting events
Youth in Switzerland
Culture of Zürich
Shooting competitions in Switzerland
Tourist attractions in Zürich